Bachelor is an unincorporated community in northern Callaway County, in the U.S. state of Missouri. The community is on Missouri Route A, approximately six miles east-southeast of Auxvasse. The headwaters of Bachelor Creek are to the northwest of the community.

History
A post office called Bachelor was established in 1875, and remained in operation until 1959. The community was named after Bachelor Creek.

References

Unincorporated communities in Callaway County, Missouri
Unincorporated communities in Missouri
Jefferson City metropolitan area